The 1998 Asian Women's Junior Handball Championship (5th tournament) took place in Osaka from 31 August–4 September. It acts as the Asian qualifying tournament for the 1999 Women's Junior World Handball Championship.

Results

Final standing

All-star team

References
www.handball.jp (Archived 2009-09-04)

External links
www.asianhandball.com

International handball competitions hosted by Japan
Asian Women's Junior Handball Championship, 1998
Asia
Asian Handball Championships